The 2002 Rallye Deutschland (formally the 51st ADAC Rallye Deutschland) was the tenth round of the 2002 World Rally Championship. The race was held over three days between 23 August and 25 August 2002, and was won by Citroen's Sébastien Loeb, his 1st win in the World Rally Championship.

Background

Entry list

Itinerary
All dates and times are CEST (UTC+2).

Results

Overall

World Rally Cars

Classification

Special stages

Championship standings

Junior World Rally Championship

Classification

Special stages

Championship standings

References

External links 
 Official website of the World Rally Championship

Rallye Deutschland
Deutschland
Rallye